A Good Day is an album by singer Jessica Molaskey. She is accompanied by her husband John Pizzarelli (a jazz guitarist); her father-in-law, Bucky Pizzarelli, also played guitar on this recording.

Track listing

Personnel
Jessica MolaskeyVocals
John Pizzarelliguitar, vocals, arrangements
Martin Pizzarellidouble-bass
Tony Tedescodrums
Ray Kennedypiano
Kenny Bergerbass clarinet
Don Sebeskyarrangements
Andy Fuscoclarinet
Tony Kadlecktrumpet
Larry Goldingsorgan
Ken Peplowskiclarinet
Bucky Pizzarelliguitars

References

2003 albums
Jessica Molaskey albums
Swing albums